A dragon boat is a human-powered watercraft originating from the Pearl River Delta region of China's southern Guangdong Province. These were made of teak, but in other parts of China different kinds of wood are used. It is one of a family of traditional paddled long boats found throughout Asia, Africa, the Pacific islands, and Puerto Rico. The sport of dragon boat racing has its roots in an ancient folk ritual of contending villagers, which dates back 2000 years throughout southern China, and even further to the original games of Olympia in ancient Greece. Both dragon boat racing and the ancient Olympiad included aspects of religious observances and community celebrations, along with competitions.

Dragon boat racing has been a traditional Chinese paddled watercraft activity for over 2000 years and began as a modern international sport in Hong Kong in 1976. These boats are typically made of carbon fiber, fiberglass, and other lightweight materials. For competition events, dragon boats are generally rigged with decorative Chinese dragon heads and tails. At other times (such as during training), decorative regalia is usually removed, although the drum often remains aboard for drummers to practice. For races, there are 18-20 people in a standard boat, and 8-10 in a small boat, not including the steersperson (sweep) and the drummer.

In December 2007, the central government of the People's Republic of China added the Dragon Boat Festival, along with the Qingming and Mid-Autumn festivals, to the schedule of national holidays.

History

Similar to the use of outrigger canoes or Polynesian va'a, dragon boat racing has a rich background of ancient ceremonial, ritualistic and religious traditions, and thus, the modern competitive aspect is but one small part of this complex dragon boat culture. The use of dragon boats for racing and dragons are believed by scholars, sinologists, and anthropologists to have originated in southern central China more than 2500 years ago, in Dongting Lake and along the banks of the Chang Jiang (now called the Yangtze) during the same era when the games of ancient Greece were being established at Olympia. Dragon boat racing has been practiced continuously since this period as the basis for annual water rituals and festival celebrations, and for the traditional veneration of the Chinese dragon water deity.  The celebration was an important part of the ancient Chinese agricultural society, celebrating the summer rice planting. Dragon boat racing was historically situated in the Chinese subcontinent's southern-central "rice bowl"; where there were rice paddies, so there were dragon boats, too.

Of the twelve animals which make up the traditional Chinese zodiac, only the Dragon is a mythical creature. All the rest are non-mythical animals, yet all twelve of the zodiac creatures were well known to members of ancient Chinese agrarian communities.  Dragons were traditionally believed to be the rulers of water on earth: rivers, lakes, and seas; they were also thought to dominate the waters of the heavens: clouds, mists, and rains. There are earth dragons, mountain dragons, and sky or celestial dragons (Tian Long) in Chinese tradition. Mythical dragons and serpents are also found widely in many cultures around the world.

Traditional dragon boat racing, in China, coincides with the 5th day of the 5th Chinese lunar month (varying from late May to June on the modern Gregorian Calendar). The summer solstice occurs around 21 June and is the reason why Chinese refer to their festival as "Duan Wu" or "Duen Ng". Both the sun and the dragon are considered to be male (the moon and the mythical phoenix, however, are considered to be female). The sun and the dragon are at their most potent during this time of the year, so cause for observing this through ritual celebrations such as dragon boat racing.  It is also the time of year when rice seedlings must be transplanted in their paddy fields to allow for wet rice cultivation. Wu or Ng refers to the sun at its highest position in the sky during the day, the meridian of 'high noon'. Duan or Duen refers to upright or directly overhead. Thus, Duan Wu is an ancient reference to the maximum position of the sun in the northern hemisphere, the longest day of the year or the summer solstice.

Venerating the dragon deity was meant to avert misfortune and calamity and encourage rainfall, which is needed for the fertility of the crops and thus, for the prosperity of an agrarian way of life.  Celestial dragons were considered the controllers of rain, monsoons, winds, and clouds.  The Emperor was "The Dragon" or the "Son of Heaven", and Chinese people sometimes refer to themselves as "dragons" because of its spirit of strength and vitality.  Unlike dragons in European mythology, which are typically considered to be evil and demonic, Asian dragons are regarded as wholesome and benevolent, and thus worthy of veneration, not slaying. If rainfall is insufficient, however, drought and famine can result. Veneration of dragons in China seems to be associated with annually ensuring life-giving water and bountiful rice harvests in south-central China.

Another ritual called Awakening of the Dragon involves a Taoist priest dotting the bulging eyes of the carved dragon head attached to the boat. Doing so symbolizes the dragon ending its slumber and reenergizing its spirit, or ch'i. In modern dragon boat festivals, a representative can be invited to step forward to dot the eyes on a dragon boat head with a brush dipped in red paint.

Not understanding the significance of Duanwu, 19th-century European observers of the racing ritual referred to the associated spectacle as a "dragon boat festival". This is the term that has become known in the West. Dragon boat racing, like Duanwu, is observed and celebrated in many areas of east Asia with a significant population of ethnic Chinese such as Singapore, Malaysia, and the Riau Islands, as well as having been adopted by the Ryukyu Islands since ancient times. The date on which races were held is referred to as the "double fifth", since Duanwu is reckoned as the fifth day of the fifth lunar month, which often falls on the Gregorian calendar month of June and occasionally in May or July. Duanwu is reckoned annually in accordance with the traditional calendar system of China, which is a combination of solar and lunar cycles, unlike the solar-based Gregorian calendar system.

The Khmer Empire used dragon boats in their naval battles.  Today, Cambodia honors the use of dragon boats by the Khmer Empire's navy by hosting dragon boat competitions at the Bon Om Touk water festival.  Laos which emerged from the Khmer Empire organizes a similar dragon boat festival on the Mekong River called Boun Suang Huea.  The world's longest dragon boat is located in Cambodia and known as the Kambojika Putta Khemara Tarei.

Crew

The crew of a standard dragon boat typically consists of 22 team members: 20 paddlers in pairs facing toward the bow of the boat, 1 drummer or caller at the bow facing toward the paddlers, and 1 steerer standing at the rear of the boat. Dragon boats, however, do vary in length and the crew size changes accordingly, from small dragon boats with only 10 paddlers up to traditional boats which have upwards of 50 paddlers, plus drummer(s) and steerer.

Drummer 
The pulsation of the drum beats produced by the drummer may be considered the "heartbeat" of the dragon boat. The drummer leads the paddlers throughout a race using the rhythmic drum beat to indicate the frequency and synchronization of all the paddlers' strokes (that is, the cadence, picking up or accelerating the pace, slowing the rate, etc.). The drummer may issue commands to the crew through a combination of hand signals and voice calls, and also generally exhorts the crew to perform at their peak. A drummer is typically mandatory during racing events, but if he or she is not present during training, it is typical for the sweep to direct the crew during a race. The drummer's role is both tactical and ceremonial. In official competitions, such as world championships, drummers must physically beat the drum, else the team may be issued a penalty. In other events or practices, the drummer of an experienced team may not hit the drum, as the team can paddle naturally together, without a drum beat.

Good drummers should be able to synchronize their drumming with the strokes of the leading pair of paddlers, rather than the other way around.

Paddlers
Pairs of paddlers sit facing forward in the boat, and use a specific type of paddle which, unlike equipment used in rowing, is not rigged to the boat in any way. The paddlers face the direction of boat-movement, dragon boaters thus "paddle," like a canoe; while rowers "row" travelling opposite the way they face as in Olympic sculling.

The paddle now accepted by the International Dragon Boat Organization has a standardized, fixed blade surface area and distinctive shape derived from the paddle shapes characteristic of that used by inhabitants of the Pearl River delta region of Guangdong Province, China adjacent to Hong Kong. The IDBF Paddle Specification 202a (PS202a) has straight flared edges and circular arced shoulders, based geometrically on an equilateral triangle positioned between the blade face and the neck of the shaft.

The first pair of paddlers, called "pacers," "strokes" or "timers," set the pace for the team and are responsible for synchronizing their strokes with one another, because it is critical that all paddlers are synchronized. The direction of the dragon boat while racing is set by the steerer, but for docking and other maneuvers, individual paddlers may be asked to paddle (while others either stop the boat or rest) according to the commands given by the drummer or steerer.

There are generally three different strokes used by paddlers: a (normal) forward stroke, a backstroke, and a draw stroke.

Steerer 
The direction of a dragon boat's movement is controlled by the steerer standing in the back of the boat. Many terms exist for the person steering the boat, such as steerer, steersperson, steerman, sweep, and helm.

The steerer manipulates a long (typically 9-feet) straight oar, called a steering oar. The steering oar is situated in a mechanism that holds the oar in place, called oar lock. The oar lock can be in a variety of designs, so long as it holds the oar in place and allows it to pivot. It is housed on top of the steering arm, which sticks out perpendicularly on the back-left of a dragon boat.

The oar is used to both steer the boat as it is moving and adjust the positioning of the boat. To steer, a steerer will put the blade of the oar into the water and either push the handle away from him/her, or pull it toward him/her. Doing so will turn the boat right or left, respectively.

A steerer can also use the steering oar to adjust the position of the boat by cranking. When a steerer cranks the steering oar, the stern of the boat moves either to the left or right, spinning the boat. This is typically executed to turn the boat around at practice or to ensure a boat is lined up straight and pointing directly down a racecourse.

A steerer uses calls to direct the paddlers. The steerer may call "paddles up" to prepare to paddle and "take it away!" to commence paddling. The steerer may use other calls such as "hold the boat" for the paddlers to brake using their paddles or "let it ride" for them to lift their paddles out of the water.

The steerer is also the person to who calls the demands in the race for paddlers to better their placement and time in the event that they are participating in.

Racing

Modern dragon boat racing is organized at the international level by the International Dragon Boat Federation (IDBF), the world governing body for the sport. The IDBF is a member of the Global Association of International Sports Federations and is a founding federation of the AIMS Group (Alliance of Independent Recognized Members of Sport) within GAISF. AIMS is an IOC-Recognized Multi Sports Organization. The International Canoe Federation (ICF) also has a dragon boat program for those of its Member Canoe Federations with an interest in dragon boat.  Both Sport and Festival racing are very competitive and many paddlers train year round, using paddling machines or pools in addition to on-water sessions.

A festival race is typically a sprint event of several hundred meters, with 500 meters being the most common. Races measuring 200, 1000, and 2000 meters are also standard distances in international competition.  Races measuring 2000 meters are normally held on a 500-meter course, requiring teams to do two loops. Teams start and end at the same end of the course, and complete three 180-degree turns. Other distances may also be used in local festivals, such as 100 or 250 meters, or another distance, depending on the size of the body of water.

Organizations, recognition and popular culture

The established International Federation for dragon boat sport is the International Dragon Boat Federation (IDBF). In 2007, the IDBF was recognized as a member of SportAccord (the former General Association of International Sports Federations, GAISF) which is part of the Olympic Movement, after SportAccord considered the historical and cultural backgrounds and identities of dragon boat sports.

IDBF member associations or federations have been established in 89 countries or territories since 1991. The IDBF is not presently an Olympic International Federation of the International Olympic Committee (IOC), but the IOC is currently considering the IDBF application for Olympic Federation status.

The International Canoe Federation, an IOC-recognized entity that governs many canoeing disciplines has also started to sanction Dragon Boat events. The ICF Dragon Boat World Championships have been held since 2006.

Accidents and incidents

 On 17 January 2010, a dragon boat capsized while training in Penang, Malaysia killed 6 paddlers on board.
 On 11 February 2011, a dragon boat capsized  while training due to wind in Præstø, Denmark killing one paddler.
 On 9 June 2016, three people drowned after their dragon boat capsized during a race in Fujian Province, China
 On 22 April 2018, seventeen drowned in a dragon boat accident on the Taohua River in Guilin, China
 On 25 September 2019, seven people drowned near Boracay, Philippines

See also
Nouka Baich

References

Dragon boat racing
Canoeing
Chinese inventions
Vietnamese traditions